The Progressive Party (PRO) was a political party in Chile. It was founded in 2010 by former Socialist deputy and presidential candidate Marco Enriquez-Ominami. It is the political successor of the coalition New Majority for Chile.

The political party was composed by Enriquez-Ominami supporters in the presidential campaign of 2009, former members of the Concertación and other leftist political movements. After a process of collecting signatures, was enrolled in some regions.

The party saw minimal success, only winning a maximum of two seats in the Chamber of Deputies. 

It lost registration after failing to gain at least 5% of the popular vote in the 2021 parliamentary elections.

The following is a list of the presidential candidates supported by the Progressive Party. (Information gathered from the Archive of Chilean Elections). 
2013: Marco Enríquez-Ominami (lost)
2017: Marco Enríquez-Ominami (lost)
2021: Marco Enríquez-Ominami (lost)

References

External links

Partido Progresista (Chile) 

2010 establishments in Chile
Democratic socialist parties in South America
Environmentalism in Chile
Left-wing politics in Chile
Political parties established in 2010
Political parties in Chile
Progressive parties
Socialist parties in Chile
Political parties disestablished in 2022